Veno Pilon (22 September 1896 – 23 September 1970) was a Slovene expressionist painter, graphic artist and photographer.

Biography 

Pilon was born in Ajdovščina, then part of the Austro-Hungarian province of Gorizia and Gradisca (now in Slovenia). After he had finished the Gorizia Grammar School, he was drafted by the Austro-Hungarian Army during World War I. He fought on the Eastern front and was captured by the Russian army. He later described his experience as a prisoner of war in the autobiography Na robu ("On the Edge"). He returned to Ajdovščina in 1919, where he took up painting.

In the late 1920s Pilon moved to Paris, where he explored photography.

He died in Ajdovščina.

References

External links
The Pilon Gallery

Slovenian male painters
Slovenian photographers
1896 births
1970 deaths
People from Ajdovščina
Prešeren Award laureates
20th-century Slovenian painters
20th-century Slovenian male artists